Loughgiel Shamrocks GAC is a Gaelic Athletic Association club located in the village of Loughgiel/Loughguile in County Antrim, Northern Ireland. They are currently the only club in Ulster to have won an All-Ireland Senior Club Hurling Championship, which they first won in 1983. They repeated the feat by defeating Coolderry from Offaly by 4-13 to 0-17 in the All Ireland Club Hurling Final on 17 March 2012. On Sunday 29 September 2013, they achieved their first four in a row of Antrim Senior Hurling Championships by beating Cushendall, in the first final to be staged outside Casement Park since 1990.

Hurling titles

All-Ireland Senior Club Hurling Championships: 2
 1983, 2012 
Ulster Senior Club Hurling Championships: 8 
 1970, 1971, 1982, 1989, 2010, 2011, 2012, 2013
Antrim Senior Hurling Championships: 20
 1920, 1924, 1925, 1929, 1938, 1943, 1956, 1963, 1966, 1967, 1968, 1970, 1971, 1982, 1989, 2010, 2011, 2012, 2013, 2016

Notable hurlers
 Barney McAuley
 Aidan McCarry
 Eddie McCloskey
 Mark McFadden
 Dominic McKinley
 Dominic McMullan
 Mick O'Connell
 Niall Patterson
 Liam Watson

References

External links
Loughgiel Shamrocks GAC Official Website

Gaelic games clubs in County Antrim
Hurling clubs in County Antrim